OLSH is an acronym for "Our Lady of the Sacred Heart," which could in turn refer to institutions such as schools or churches.

Several such institutions:
Our Lady of the Sacred Heart High School' in Coraopolis, Pennsylvania.
Our Lady of the Sacred Heart College, Adelaide, in Enfield, South Australia
Our Lady of the Sacred Heart College, Sydney, in Kensington, New South Wales